Marie-Amélie Le Fur (born 26 September 1988) is a French Paralympic athlete from Vendôme, Centre Region, competing in T44 sprint and F44 long jump events. Her left leg was amputated below the knee following a motor scooter accident in 2004. Before she lost her leg, she was a French junior running champion.

Le Fur competed in the 2008 Summer Paralympics in Beijing, China. There she won a silver medal in the women's Long jump - F44 event, a silver medal in the women's 100 metres - T44 event, and finished eighth in the women's 200 metres - T44 event.

Le Fur won gold in the T44 100m in London 2012 in a photo-finish, just ahead of Netherlands' Marlou van Rhijn and the USA's April Holmes. She won silver in the T44 200m, behind T43 athlete Marlou van Rhijn, but in a new T44 world record time.

In the 2016 Summer Paralympic Games in Rio de Janeiro, Brazil, Le Fur captured gold medals in both the long jump T44 and the 400 metres T44 events, both with world records. She also won a bronze medal in the 200 metre- T44 event.

She also represented France at the 2020 Summer Paralympics in Tokyo, Japan. She won the silver medal in the women's long jump T64 event.

References

External links
 
 
 
 

1988 births
Living people
French female sprinters
French female long jumpers
World record holders in Paralympic athletics
Paralympic athletes of France
Paralympic gold medalists for France
Paralympic silver medalists for France
Paralympic bronze medalists for France
Paralympic medalists in athletics (track and field)
Athletes (track and field) at the 2008 Summer Paralympics
Athletes (track and field) at the 2012 Summer Paralympics
Athletes (track and field) at the 2016 Summer Paralympics
Athletes (track and field) at the 2020 Summer Paralympics
Medalists at the 2008 Summer Paralympics
Medalists at the 2012 Summer Paralympics
Medalists at the 2016 Summer Paralympics
Medalists at the 2020 Summer Paralympics
People from Vendôme
Sportspeople from Loir-et-Cher
French sports executives and administrators